Dartford is a constituency represented in the House of Commons of the UK Parliament since 2010 by Gareth Johnson of the Conservative Party. It is currently the longest-valid 'bellwether' constituency in the country as the party of the winning candidate has gone on to form the government at every UK general election since 1964.  Candidates for the largest two parties nationally have polled first and second since 1923 in Dartford.

The area in the seat, remaining a combination of urban, suburban and a small rural population, has been gradually reduced through contribution to new seats, their county designation later being changed in 1965 to become part of the new county of Greater London, which adjoins. These seats are Bexley, created in 1945 and Erith & Crayford, created in 1955.

History
The seat was created under the Redistribution of Seats Act 1885. This Act added a net 18 seats, but its main purpose was to correct the over-representation of minor, often still old boroughs and depopulated county divisions. In their place were created new seats with a larger population. In Kent the Act finally abolished the Sandwich constituency, which sent two MPs until 1885. It also halved the representation of no fewer than four other historic towns. In contrast a seat for Dartford, the North-Western Division of Kent or North West Kent, was created.

Political history
In the early 20th century, the Dartford constituency was very much a bellwether. Dartford's results later shifted towards the left: in a by-election in 1938 and then general elections from 1951 to 1959, a Labour MP was elected against the national result. Since 1964, however, Dartford has alternated between Labour and the Conservatives in line with the national result, and thus has served as a bellwether again.

This was the first seat contested by future Prime Minister Margaret Thatcher (then Margaret Roberts), at the 1950 and 1951 general elections. She was unsuccessful on both occasions, with Labour retaining the seat and  being re-elected to government in 1950; only to lose power to the Conservatives a year later.

Boundaries

1885–1918: The Sessional Division of Dartford, and part of the Sessional Division of Bromley.

1918–1945: The Urban Districts of Bexley, Dartford, and Erith, and in the Rural District of Dartford the parishes of Crayford, Stone, and Swanscombe.

1945–1955: The Boroughs of Dartford and Erith, and the Urban District of Crayford.

1955–1974: The Borough of Dartford, the Urban District of Swanscombe, and the Rural District of Dartford.

1974–1983: The Borough of Dartford, the Urban District of Swanscombe, and in the Rural District of Dartford the parishes of Darenth, Southfleet, Stone, Sutton-at-Hone, and Wilmington.

1983–1997: The Borough of Dartford, and the District of Sevenoaks wards of Ash-cum-Ridley, Fawkham and Hartley, Horton Kirby, and Longfield.

1997–2010: The Borough of Dartford, and the District of Sevenoaks wards of Fawkham and Hartley, and Horton Kirby.

2010–present: The Borough of Dartford, and the District of Sevenoaks ward of Hartley and Hodsoll Street.

Constituency profile
As its name suggests, the main settlement in the constituency is the town of Dartford, but it also includes a number of other towns and villages, including Swanscombe, Longfield, Greenhithe and Wilmington. These all add up to create a diverse constituency which covers urban and rural areas.

The population of the constituency currently stands at around 90,000, around 8,000 of whom live in the borough of Sevenoaks, with the remainder living in the borough of Dartford. The constituency is on the border with the London Borough of Bexley, with which at one time it shared an MP.

Health and wealth of its residents is around average for the UK.

Members of Parliament

Elections

Elections in the 2010s

Elections in the 2000s

Elections in the 1990s

Elections in the 1980s

Elections in the 1970s

Elections in the 1960s

Elections in the 1950s

:

:

Election in the 1940s

1945 saw radical boundary changes, with half the constituency becoming part of the Bexley seat.

Elections in the 1930s

Elections in the 1920s

Elections in the 1910s 

General Election 1914–15:

Another General Election was required to take place before the end of 1915. The political parties had been making preparations for an election to take place and by July 1914, the following candidates had been selected; 
Liberal: James Rowlands
Unionist:

Elections in the 1900s

Elections in the 1890s

Elections in the 1880s 

 Caused by Dyke's appointment as Vice-president of the Committee of the Council on Education.

See also
List of parliamentary constituencies in Kent

Notes

References

Borough of Dartford
Parliamentary constituencies in Kent
Constituencies of the Parliament of the United Kingdom established in 1885